Lasius latipes is a species of ant in the genus Lasius. It is native to the United States.

References

External links

latipes
Hymenoptera of North America
Insects of the United States
Insects described in 1863
Taxa named by Benjamin Dann Walsh
Taxonomy articles created by Polbot
Taxobox binomials not recognized by IUCN